The 1936–37 season was the 40th in the history of the Western Football League.

The Division One champions for the fourth time in their history and for the second consecutive season were Bristol Rovers Reserves. The winners of Division Two were Weymouth. There was again no promotion or relegation between the two divisions this season.

Division One
After Bath City and Cardiff City Reserves left the league, Division One was reduced from six to five clubs, with one new club joining.

Bristol City Reserves, rejoining after leaving the league in 1933.

Division Two
Division Two remained at eighteen clubs after Bath City Reserves left and one new club joined:

Yeovil and Petters United Reserves, rejoining after leaving the league in 1929.

References

1936-37
4